Bluff is a rural town and  locality in the Central Highlands Region, Queensland, Australia.

Geography

Bluff's location between some of Queensland's largest coal mines and the port of Gladstone has led to it becoming a major interchange station for large coal trains, some up to two kilometres long.

History
Based on artefacts found on the nearby Blackdown Tableland National Park, Aboriginal people  lived in this area for thousands of years.

The first European settlement occurred in the district in the 1860s as early pastoralists moved to the area.

The district was originally called Duckworth or Duckworth Creek, but in 1877 the name was changed to Bluff to match the name of the railway station. The Bluff name was derived from a local hill known as Arthur's Bluff.

Duckworth Post Office opened by September 1906 (a receiving office had been open from late 1905) and was renamed Bluff in 1907.

Duckworth Provisional School  was established in January 1907 and opened in June 1907. However, the local people disliked the name Duckworth and a few months later, the name was changed to Bluff or Bluff Colliery Provisional School. On 1 January 1909, it became Bluff State School.

At the 2011 census, Bluff had a population of 370.

In 2017, a suspicious fire completely destroyed the Bluff Family Store, the town's local general store.  Without anywhere to buy groceries, local Bluff residents needed to travel to Blackwater for supplies following the fire.  However, three years after the fire, an independent business called the Bluff Servo opened in the town to continue supplying the community with groceries, toiletries and fuel.

Bluff and the surrounding districts are served by the Bluff Town and Rural Fire Brigade which has had active members on its books since 1975.  A small shed in Church Street was built to house the brigade in 1980.  After obtaining funding to build a larger facility in 2016, a new fire shed was built in Church Street which was officially opened in May 2018.

Education 

Bluff State School is a government primary (Prep-6) school for boys and girls at Main Street. In 2017, the school had an enrolment of 15 students with 2 teachers and 4 non-teaching staff (2 full-time equivalent).

Notable residents
 Casey Conway, National Rugby League player for Sydney Roosters

References

External links
 
 

Towns in Queensland
Central Highlands Region
Localities in Queensland